Senegal has competed in the African Games since the first edition in 1965. Until 2015, the competition was known as the All-Africa Games. Senegal has won a total of 289 medals.

Medals by Games

Below is a table representing all Senegalese medals across the Games in which it has competed.

See also 
 Senegal at the Olympics
 Senegal at the Paralympics
 Sports in Senegal

References

External links 
 BEST sports - All Africa Games - Senegal